Nguyễn Sinh Khiêm (1888–1950), renamed Nguyễn Tất Đạt in accordance with Confucian tradition, was the brother of President Hồ Chí Minh of Việt Nam and also the brother of Nguyễn Thị Thanh. Khiêm was a geomancer and traditional herbalist.

References

External links
Provides a photo of him, along with his parents and sister.  The website also has a little information about him in Vietnamese.

Vietnamese communists
1888 births
1950 deaths
Ho Chi Minh

vi:Gia đình Hồ Chí Minh#Nguyễn Sinh Khiêm